The Very Best of Toni Childs is the first greatest hits album by American singer-songwriter, Toni Childs. It was successful in Australia and New Zealand, peaking in the top 10 in both countries.

Childs' version of Many Rivers to Cross was featured prominently in television advertisements for the National Australia Bank at the time. The song was re-released in Australia and peaked at No.12.

Track listing

Charts
The Very Best of Toni Childs debuted at No.20 in Australia before peaking at No.1 for 6 weeks.

Weekly charts

Year-end charts

Certifications and sales

See also
List of number-one albums in Australia during the 1990s

References

Mushroom Records albums
1996 greatest hits albums
Toni Childs albums